Dichodon is a fossil genus of mammals belonging to the family Xiphodontidae.

The species of this genus are found in Europe.

Species:
 Dichodon cartieri Rutimeyer, 1891 
 Dichodon cervinus Owen, 1848

References

Eocene even-toed ungulates
Prehistoric even-toed ungulate genera